Johannes Clauberg (24 February 1622 – 31 January 1665) was a German theologian and philosopher. Clauberg was the founding Rector of the first University of Duisburg, where he taught from 1655 to 1665. He is known as a "scholastic cartesian".

Biography 

He was born in Solingen, and educated in the Aristotelian tradition in Köln, Moers and Bremen, then in Groningen, where he discovered what came to be called the reformed variation of Aristotelianism. He gave his first disputations in Groningen under the supervision of Tobias Andreae. His first treatise in metaphysics was written in those student years: Elementa philosophiae sive Ontosophia (1647). Travelling in France and England, he came to study the Cartesian philosophy under Johannes de Raey at Leiden. In 1649, he became professor of philosophy and theology at Herborn, but subsequently (1651), in consequence of the jealousy of his colleagues, accepted an invitation to a similar post at Duisburg.

Clauberg was one of the earliest teachers of the new doctrines in Germany and an exact and methodical commentator on his masters writings. His theory of the connection between the soul and the body is in some respects analogous to that of Malebranche; but he is not therefore to be regarded as a true forerunner of Occasionalism, as he uses Occasion for the stimulus which directly produces a mental phenomenon, without postulating the intervention of God. His view of the relation of God to his creatures is held to foreshadow the pantheism of Spinoza. All creatures exist only through the continuous creative energy of the Divine Being, and are no more independent of his will than are our thoughts independent of us, or rather less, for there are thoughts which force themselves upon us whether we will or not.

Metaphysics, in Clauberg's conception, studies not the being (ens), but the intelligible, as in the most general object of the intellect (ens cogitabile). The most high concept is not being, but the object in general as known to the intellect. For metaphysics Clauberg suggested the names ontosophy or ontology, the latter being afterwards adopted by Wolff. In the prolegomena to his Elementa philosophiae sive Ontosophiae (1647), Clauberg says:

Étienne Gilson writes:

Clauberg died in Duisburg, and lies buried in the city's cathedral.

Works
A collected edition of his philosophical works was published at Amsterdam (1691), with life by H. C. Hennin; see also E. Zeller, Geschichte der deutschen Philosophie seit Leibnitz (1873).

 Disputatio theologica practica de conscientia, Groningen, 1646.
 [prop.], Tobias Andreae [praes.], Tessarakas thesium philosophicarum de logicae ab aliis disciplinis quibuscum vulgo confundi assolet distinctione  (Groningen, 1646), 4 p.
 Elementa philosophiae seu Ontosophia. Scientia prima, de iis quae Deo creaturisque suo modo communiter attribuuntur, distincta partibus quatuor, quarum I. Prolegomena, quibus ostenditur ratio huius scientiae perficiendae; II. Didactica, ipse nim. Ontosophia seu scientia prima et catholica methodo didascalicae inclusa brevissime; III. De usu illius scientiae in caeteris facultatibus ac scientiis omnibus; IV. Diacritica de differentia huius scientiae ab aliis disciplinis et imprimis theologia et logica quibuscum vulgo confundi solet. Pro mensura gratiae divinae impraesentiarum adspiranis elaborata, et ad elicienda Doctorum de his conatibus vel continuandis vel corrigendis iudiciis, iuris publici facta (Groningen, 1647).
 Defensio cartesiana adversus Iacobum Revium ... et Cyriacum Lentulum pars prior exoterica, in qua Renati Cartesii dissertatio de Methodo vindicatur, simul illustria Cartesianae logicae et philosophiae specimina exhibentur (Amsterdam, 1652).
 Logica vetus et nova, quadripartita, modum inveniendae ac tradendae veritatis in Genesi simul et analysi facile methodo exhibens (Editio princeps, Amsterdam, 1654; Editio secunda, Amsterdam, 1658; Editio tertia, Sulzbach, 1685); Specimen logicae Cartesianae seu modus philosophandi ubi ... in quibusdam novae introductionis in philosophiam aulicam veritas paucis expenditur. Studio Pauli Michaelis Rhegenii (Leipzig, 1689).
 Initiatio philosophi, sive dubitatio Cartesiana, ad metaphysicam certitudinem viam aperiens (Leiden, 1655).
 De Cognitione Dei et nostri, quatenus naturali rationis lumine, secundum veram philosophiam, potest comparari, exercitationes centum (Duisburg, 1656).
 Redenkonst, Het menschelyk verstandt in de dingen te beghrijpen, oordelen, en onthouden, stierende Johan Klauberghens. Vertaalt uit het Latyn (Amsterdam, 1657).
 Paraphrasis in R. Descartes Meditationes de prima Philosophia (Duisburg, 1658).
 Ontosophia nova, quae vulgo Metaphysica, Theologiae, Iurisprudentiae et Philologiae, praesertim Germanicae studiosis accomodata. Accessit Logica contracta, et quae ex ea demonstratur Orthographia Germanica (Duisburg, 1660); Metaphysica de ente, quae rectius Ontosophia... Editio tertia (Amsterdam, 1664); Ontosophia, quae vulgo metaphysica vocatur, notis perpetuis in philosophiae et theologiae studiosorum usum illustrata, a Joh. Henrico Suicero. In calce annexa est Claubergii logica contracta (Tiguri, 1694).
 Ars Etymologica Teutonum e Philosophiae fontibus derivata, id est, via Germanicarum vocum et origines et praestantiam detegendi ; cum plurium tum harum Vernunft, Suchen, Außspruch exemplis atque exinde enatis regulis praemonstrata (Duisburg, 1663).
 Physica, quibus rerum corporearum vis et natura... explicantur (Amsterdam, 1664); Dictata physica privata, id est physica contracta seu theses physicae, commentario perpetuo explicatae (Frankfurt, 1681; Leipzig, 1689).
 [praes.], Chilias thesium ad philosophiam naturalem pertinentium... disputanda in Academia Duisburgensi (Groningen, 1668).
 Differentia inter Cartesianum et alias in Scholis usitatam Philosophiam (Groningen, 1680).
 Opera omnia philosophica, ed. Johannes Theodor Schalbruch, 2 vol. (Amsterdam, 1691); reprint Hildesheim, Georg Olms, 1968.

Notes

Further reading
 Bardout, Jean-Christophe. Johannes Clauberg, in Steven Nadler (ed.), A Companion to Early Modern Philosophy, Malden: Blackwell, 2002, pp. 140–151.
 Savini, Massimiliano. Johannes Clauberg, Methodus cartesiana et ontologie, Paris: Vrin, 2011.
 Theo Verbeek (ed.). Johannes Clauberg (1622–1665) and Cartesian Philosophy in the Seventeenth Century, Dordrecht: Kluwer, 1999.

External links
 Alice Ragni, Bibliographia Claubergiana (Nineteenth–Twenty-First Centuries): Tracking a Crossroads in the History of Philosophy
 Francesco Trevisani, Johannes Clauberg und der reformierte Aristoteles 
 The Birth of Ontology. A selection of Ontologists from 1560 to 1770

German philosophers
People from Duisburg
1622 births
1665 deaths
German male writers